The Violet Hour is the second studio album by English indie pop band The Clientele. The album was released on 8 July 2003 by Merge Records and Pointy Records. It is the band's first proper full-length album composed primarily of new material.

"Haunted Melody" was released as a single in October 2002, backed with "Fear of Falling". "House on Fire" was released as a single in June 2003, backed with "Jamaican Rum Rhumba" (Take Two) and "Breathing Soft and Low".

The enhanced CD release of the album features two bonus videos for "House on Fire" and the track "Reflections After Jane" from Suburban Light.

Track listing

Personnel
Credits for The Violet Hour adapted from album liner notes.

The Clientele
 Alasdair MacLean – vocals, guitar
 James Hornsey – bass
 Mark Keen – drums, piano

Production
 Mike Jones – engineering

Artwork and design
 Maxi del Campo – photography
 Michael Williams – photography

References

External links
 
 

2003 albums
The Clientele albums
Merge Records albums